The third cycle of Asia's Next Top Model aired from March to June 2015. Nadya Hutagalung confirmed that she would not be returning for cycle three. She was replaced by Filipino model and TV personality Georgina Wilson. Joey Mead-King returned to the judging panel for the third time, while Australia's Next Top Model judge and fashion designer Alex Perry also joined the show as a new judge.

The cycle featured 14 contestants, three from Indonesia and the Philippines, two from Hong Kong and Malaysia, and one each from Japan, Singapore, Thailand and Vietnam. Nepal was once again unrepresented. China, India, South Korea, and Taiwan were also not represented this cycle. The show was filmed in Singapore once again.

The prize package for this cycle included a brand new Subaru XV STI, the chance of becoming the new face of TRESemmé for one of their 2015 campaigns, the chance to appear in a spread and on the cover of Harper's Bazaar Singapore and a modeling contract with Storm Model Management in London.

The winner of the competition was 23-year-old Ayu Gani, from Indonesia.

Auditions
Casting calls were held in three countries, listed below:

October 4 & 5 at Resorts World Manila, Manila
October 10 at JW Marriott, Jakarta
October 11 at ION Sky Level 56, ION Orchard, Singapore City

Contestants were also encouraged to apply for the competition online if they were unable to make an appearance at the live auditions.

Cast

Contestants
(Ages stated are at start of contest)

Judges
 Georgina Wilson (host)
 Joey Mead King
 Alex Perry

Episodes

Results

 The contestant was eliminated
 The contestant was part of a non-elimination bottom two
 The contestant won the challenge and was immune from elimination
 The contestant won the competition

Average  call-out order
Episode 13 is not included.

Bottom two/three

 The contestant was eliminated after their first time in the bottom two/three
 The contestant was eliminated after their second time in the bottom two/three
 The contestant was eliminated after their third time in the bottom two/three
 The contestant was eliminated after their fourth time in the bottom two/three
 The contestant was eliminated in the first round of elimination and placed third
 The contestant was eliminated and placed as the runner-up

Notes

References

External links
Official website (archive at the Wayback Machine)
Asia's Next Top Model on STAR World (archive at the Wayback Machine)

Asia's Next Top Model
2015 Singaporean television seasons
Television shows filmed in Singapore